The Michigan Israel Business Accelerator, or MIBA, is an independent nonprofit organization that promotes economic ties between the  of Michigan and the State of Israel. Founded in 2007 and based in Detroit, it strives to establish and strengthen business relations between Michigan-based companies and Israeli innovative and entrepreneurial talents through trade missions, monthly meetings and other events.

Background
The Michigan Israel Business Bridge was co-founded by Charles (Chuck) Newman and Susan Herman in 2007. Newman and Herman assisted a Michigan State University student's efforts to launch an exhibition featuring Israeli business and technology. The success of that event and others like it in Lansing and Grand Rapids compelled Newman to create MIBB. Haifa native Hannan Lis, CEO of Lis Ventures LLC and president of the American Technion Society, is a third co-founder. Ron Perry of Ann Arbor, formerly with Medtronic, was taken on as executive director in 2008. Pamela Lippitt, formerly with the Zionist Organization of America, was named executive director in 2010.

Operations
Governor Jennifer M. Granholm addressed the second annual Michigan Israel Business Bridge automotive partnership conference in Israel in 2008. In 2009, MIBB partnered with the Michigan Economic Development Corporation, the Israel Export and International Cooperation Institute and Automation Alley bringing together local Michigan executives and representatives from thirteen Israeli companies to discuss global economic challenges in Troy. Wayne State University and MIBB partnered in 2011 to launch the Michigan Israel Business Bridge internship program.

See also

 BIRD Foundation
 Economy of Michigan
 Economy of Israel
 Start-up Nation
 U.S.–Israel relations

References

External links
 Cooperation Between Israel and the State of Michigan – Jewish Virtual Library

International trade organizations
Economy of Michigan
Foreign trade of Israel
Israel friendship associations
Organizations established in 2007
2007 establishments in Michigan